The 1st Caucasus Army Corps (Russian, 1-й Кавказский армейский корпус) was a military formation of the Russian Empire which existed between 1847 and 1918, including the period during World War I.

It was reformed on December 17, 1878. From November 1888 to March 1899, it was named the Caucasus Army Corps.

History 
In the first half of the 19th century the Caucasus Army Corps of the Russian Ground Forces formed the basis of the military management of the Armed Forces. The total number of corps varied from five in 1810 to twenty in 1825 (including eight separate corps: Guard, Grenadier, Caucasus, Finnish, Lithuanian, Orenburg, Siberian, and internal guard). In 1833 the number of corps was reduced to fifteen. For the period of the Eastern (Crimean) War (1855-1856) three new corps were created, and after its completion four corps were disbanded.

Army and cavalry corps were abolished from 1862 to 1864 during the military reforms of Dmitry Milyutin. However, advantages in combat readiness of corps organization led to their reconstruction from 1874 to 1879. Each corps included a directorate, two or three infantry division and one cavalry division, all with artillery.

On March 22, 1899 by the highest order the 20th and 39th infantry divisions, the 1st and 2nd Caucasus Cossack divisions, the 1st and 2nd Kuban Plastun battalions, the 20th and 39th artillery brigades, the 2nd and 5th Cossack batteries, the 20th and 39th flying artillery parks were allocated from the Caucasus army corps. This unit was called the 1st Caucasus Army Corps, which was formed on May 1, 1899.

Composition

1890 
В Кавказском армейском корпусе:

 one grenadier division 
 two infantry divisions
 two Caucasus Cossack divisions
 two infantry Plastun battalions
 two batteries of the Kuban Cossack army

1894 

 Staff
 20th Infantry Division
 1st Brigade
 77th Tengin Infantry Regiment
 78th Navagin Infantry Regiment
 2nd Brigade
 79th Kura Infantry Regiment
 80th Kabardian Infantry Regiment
 20th Artillery Brigade
 39th Infantry Division
 1st Brigade
 153rd Baku Infantry Regiment
 154th Derbent Infantry Regiment
 2nd Brigade
 155th Cuban Infantry Regiment
 156th Infantry Elisavetpol Regiment
 39th Artillery Brigade
 1st Caucasus Rifle Brigade
 1st Caucasus Rifle Regiment
 2nd Caucasus Rifle Regiment
 3rd Caucasus Rifle Regiment
 4th Caucasus Rifle Regiment
 1st Caucasus Rifle Artillery Division
 Kuban Plastun Brigade
 1st Kuban Plastun General-Field Marshal Grand Duke Mikhail Nikolaevich battalion
 2nd Kuban Plastun Her Imperial Highness Grand Duchess Olga Nikolaevna battalion
 3rd Kuban Plastun battalion of His Imperial Highness Heir to the Tsarevich
 4th Kuban Plastun battalion of His Imperial Highness Grand Duke Georgy Mikhailovich
 5th Kuban Plastun battalion of His Imperial Highness Grand Duke Boris Vladimirovich
 6th Kuban Plastun His Majesty Battalion
 1st Caucasus Cossack Division
 1st Brigade
 1st Kuban Regiment
 1st Uman Regiment
 2nd Brigade
 1st Khopersky Regiment
 1st Gorsko-Mozdok Regiment
 1st Caucasus Cossack Division
 1st Caucasus Mortar-artillery Division
 Caucasus Spark Company
 1st Caucasus Sapper Battalion

Part of 

 Russian Caucasus Army: 1913–1917

Commanders 

 Lieutenant General N. A. Kluyev: 1913–1914
 General Piechoty G. J. Bergmann: 1914–1915
 General Kawalerii P. P. Kalitin: 1915–1917
 Lieutenant General Vladimir Liakhov: 1917

References

External links 

 1st Caucasus Army Corps
 The Russian Army in the Great War: Formations Card File
 

Corps of the Russian Empire
Military units and formations of Russia in World War I